The 1953 Kent State Golden Flashes football team was an American football team that represented Kent State University in the Mid-American Conference (MAC) during the 1953 college football season. In their eighth season under head coach Trevor J. Rees, the Golden Flashes compiled a 7–2 record (3–1 against MAC opponents), finished in a tie for third place in the MAC, and outscored all opponents by a combined total of 250 to 103.

The team's statistical leaders included Lou Mariano with 816 rushing yards, Don Burke with 577 passing yards, and Gino Gioia with 84 receiving yards. Fullback Jim Cullom and offensive tackle Al Kilgore were selected as first-team All-MAC players.

Schedule

References

Kent State
Kent State Golden Flashes football seasons
Kent State Golden Flashes football